Michael D. Moore (born Dennis Michael Sheffield, October 14, 1914 – March 4, 2013) was a Canadian-born American film director, second unit director, and child actor, when he was credited as Mickey Moore (or Micky Moore). He was credited as Michael Moore on all the films and TV shows he directed, and on most of the films on which he was second unit director.

Life and career

Dennis Michael Sheffield was born in Vancouver, British Columbia, the son of Thomas William Sheffield, a British marine engineer, and his wife, Norah Moore Sheffield, an actress from Dublin. He and his brother Patrick were Hollywood silent film child actors. At the age of five he appeared in his first film under the stage name "Mickey Moore", chosen because their mother "decided that the boys should work under her maiden name of Moore." He appeared in two dozen films, including The Dramatic Life of Abraham Lincoln (1924) and The King of Kings (1927), until 1927 when he was 13.

In the early 1950s, Moore began working as an assistant director. He was first A.D. on dozens of major motion pictures including The Ten Commandments (1956), and Gunfight at the O.K. Corral (1957). He was an assistant director on several Elvis Presley musical films and directed Presley in the film Paradise, Hawaiian Style (1966) for Paramount Pictures. Because of that, plus his experience directing a western film, Metro-Goldwyn-Mayer hired him to direct rock and roll singer Roy Orbison in The Fastest Guitar Alive (1967). He worked exclusively as a director in film and television from 1965 to 1969.

He then became a second unit director, working on numerous major films such as Butch Cassidy and the Sundance Kid (1969), Patton (1970), and The Man Who Would Be King (1975). He was credited as associate producer in charge of action and animal scenes for Quest for Fire (1981). In the 1980s, Steven Spielberg hired Moore as second unit director on Raiders of the Lost Ark, Indiana Jones and the Temple of Doom, and Indiana Jones and the Last Crusade. His association with Spielberg led him to direct the "Alamo Jobe" episode of the Amazing Stories television series. Moore was still active as a second unit director into his eighties. His last work was for Disney's 2000 film, 102 Dalmatians.

Moore attended Venice High School in the 1930s where he played football. He married high school sweetheart Esther McNeil in 1933 and had two daughters, Sandra Kastendiek-Drake (born 1936) and Patricia Newman (born 1937). McNeil died in 1992 and Moore married Laurie Abdo, formerly a personal assistant of Paramount producer Howard W. Koch, five years later; Abdo died in 2011.

Death
Moore died of congestive heart failure at the age of 98 in Malibu, California on March 4, 2013.

References

Bibliography
 Holmstrom, John. The Moving Picture Boy: An International Encyclopaedia from 1895 to 1995, Norwich, Michael Russell, 1996, pp. 73–74.

External links

Mickey(aged 7) with Jack Holt and Mary Miles Minter in the film All Souls Eve 1921 (Univ. of Washington, Sayre collection)

1914 births
2013 deaths
20th-century American male actors
American film directors
American male film actors
American male silent film actors
American male child actors
Canadian emigrants to the United States
Film directors from Vancouver
Male actors from Vancouver
People from Greater Los Angeles
American people of English descent
American people of Irish descent